is a train station in Itami, Hyōgo Prefecture, Japan.

Lines
Hankyu Railway
Itami Line

Adjacent stations

Railway stations in Hyōgo Prefecture
Railway stations in Japan opened in 1935